Former infantry regiments of Canada
Military units and formations established in 1914
Military units and formations disestablished in 1936
Military units and formations of British Columbia

The Kootenay Regiment was an infantry regiment of the Non-Permanent Active Militia of the Canadian Militia (now the Canadian Army). In 1936, the regiment was converted to artillery to form the 24th Field Artillery Regiment, RCA which is today currently on the Supplementary Order of Battle.

Lineage

The Kootenay Regiment 

 Originated on 1 May 1914, in Fernie, British Columbia as an eight company regiment of infantry.
 Redesignated on 2 November 1914, as the 107th (East Kootenay) Regiment.
 Redesignated on 12 March 1920, as The Kootenay Regiment.
 Converted on 15 December 1936, from infantry to artillery and Redesignated as the 24th (Kootenay) Field Brigade, RCA (now the 24th Field Artillery Regiment, RCA - currently on the Supplementary Order of Battle).

Lineage Chart

Perpetuations 

 54th Battalion (Kootenay), CEF
 225th (Kootenay) Battalion, CEF

Organization

107th (East Kootenay) Regiment (01 January, 1915) 

 A Company (Fernie, British Columbia)
 B Company (Fernie, British Columbia)
 C Company (Cranbrook, British Columbia)
 D Company (Cranbrook, British Columbia)
 E Company (Elko, British Columbia)
 F Company (Creston, British Columbia)
 G Company (Athalmer, British Columbia)
 H Company (Golden, British Columbia)

107th East Kootenay Regiment (01 April, 1916) 

 A Company (Fernie, British Columbia)
 B Company (Fernie, British Columbia)
 C Company (Michel, British Columbia)
 D Company (Cranbrook, British Columbia)
 E Company (Fernie, British Columbia)
 F Company (Creston, British Columbia)
 G Company (Nelson, British Columbia)
 H Company (Nelson, British Columbia)

The Kootenay Regiment (01 March, 1921) 

 1st Battalion (perpetuating the 54th Battalion, CEF)
 A Company (Nelson, BC; later moved to Kimberley, British Columbia)
 B Company (Fernie, BC; later moved to Cranbrook, British Columbia)
 C Company (Cranbrook, British Columbia)
 D Company (Creston, British Columbia)
 2nd (Reserve) Battalion (perpetuating 225th Battalion, CEF)

Battle Honours 

 Mount Sorrel
 Somme, 1916
 Ancre Heights
 Ancre, 1916
 Arras, 1917, '18
 Vimy, 1917
 Hill 70
 Ypres, 1917
 Passchendaele
 Amiens
 Scarpe, 1918
 Drocourt–Quéant
 Hindenburg Line
 Canal du Nord
 Valenciennes
 Sambre
 France and Flanders, 1916–18

References